Frank J. Wilson (died February 1990) was an American judge who served on the Cook County Circuit Court in Illinois.  He is most notable for presiding in the murder trial of Chicago mobster Harry Aleman, the only person in U.S. History to be tried a second time for the same crime by the same government after being acquitted (Aleman bribed Judge Wilson, and thus it was decided he was never in jeopardy, and thus could be retried). Frank J. Wilson eventually committed suicide with a self-inflicted gunshot wound to the head after the bribe scheme was revealed.

References

Illinois state court judges
Year of birth missing
1990 suicides
Suicides by firearm in Arizona